RNIE 2 is a national highway of Benin. It is Benin's main north–south highway which runs the entire 785 km down the centre of the country from the Niger River to Cotonou. The RNIE 2 crosses the RNIE 4 at Bohicon east of Abomey.

Cities and towns
Parakou
Cotonou
Bohicon
Kassakou

References

Roads in Benin